French Food at Home is a James Beard Foundation Award-winning cooking show presented by Laura Calder. It is filmed in Halifax, Nova Scotia and airs on Food Network Canada, the Asian Food Channel, and the Cooking Channel.
French Food at Home is a lifestyle series featuring simple French home cooking which anyone, anywhere, can make. All 78 episodes were shot in a home kitchen in Canada and include scenes of France (filmed in France) such as trips to the market and glimpses of everyday French food life. Music for the show was composed by Mike O'Neill.

Episodes list

Season 1
Spring flavored"
Dinner so Chic
Charcuterie Inspiration
French Food for Kids
Spring Flavors
French Holiday Dinner
First Courses
Dinner Outdoors
Chateau Memories
Fish Forever
Classic Bistro Desserts
French Food Fast
Breakfast Abroad
Country Dinner
Mediterrean Flavours
Comfort Food
Served Family Style
Bechamel Creations
Cheese 101
Chocolate Obsession
Aromatic Inspiration
Apero
Savoury Tarts
Eggs Anytime
Stand Alone Salads
Sweet Tarts
The Perfect Potato

Season 2
The Sweet Choux Show
Cooking for One
French Africa
Cooking with Wine
From the French Pantry
The Bread Show
French Ways with Vegetables
France City Tour
French Fruit Desserts
The Puff Pasty Show
The Butter Show
Simple Terrines
Simple Classics
The Olive Show
French for Dieters
Celebratory Chocolate Desserts
Truckstop French
Tribute to French Canada
Vegetarian
Picnic
Stuffed!
Girls Dinner
Reunion Food
Around Bordeaux Dinner
Dinner from the Potager
Salt and Pepper

Season 3
Small Pleasures
Exotica
Thrifty
Grandma's House
How Grand
Cozy
The Slow Show
Artist Dinner
Champagne Dinner
Lazy Daze
Sunday Lunch
Summer Buffet
Confidence Builders
Woodland Feast
Cook for a Chef
Mediterranean Sun
Moveable Feast
Gimick-Free
Free Spirit
French Barbecue
The Retro Show
The Beauty Show
Life's Luxuries
Cocktail Dinner
Well Preserved
Frenchified
Dinner at the Chateau (special)

Awards and nominations
2010 : James Beard Foundation Award, New York City
  Television Show, In Studio or Fixed Location

Broadcasters
Original
Food Network Canada
Syndicate
Cooking Channel

References

2007 Canadian television series debuts
2000s Canadian cooking television series
2010 Canadian television series endings
2010s Canadian cooking television series
Cooking Channel original programming
Food Network (Canadian TV channel) original programming
Television shows filmed in Halifax, Nova Scotia